Rozniaty may refer to the following places in Poland:
Rożniaty, Subcarpathian Voivodeship (south-east Poland)
Różniaty, Kuyavian-Pomeranian Voivodeship (north-central Poland)